Philip MacDonald is an author.

Philip MacDonald may also refer to:

Philip MacDonald, character in Adam's Woman
Philip MacDonald (athlete) (1904–1978), Canadian athlete

See also
Philip McDonald (disambiguation)